Les Revenants EP is the eleventh EP by Scottish post-rock band Mogwai. It was released on 17 December 2012 in a digital format through Rock Action Records, and was released physically in 10" vinyl format on 28 January 2013.  The EP contains three tracks from the full-length soundtrack album of the same name (two of these are alternative versions), plus a bonus track ("Soup").

Track listing 
 "Wizard Motor"
 "Soup" 
 "The Huts" (version)
 "This Messiah Needs Watching" (version)

Personnel
Stuart Braithwaite – guitar, vocals 
Dominic Aitchison – bass 
Martin Bulloch – drums 
John Cummings - piano, guitar
Barry Burns – keyboards

References

2013 EPs
Mogwai EPs
Rock Action Records albums